Omarius Hines (born December 18, 1989) is an American football wide receiver who is currently a free agent.

University of Florida
Hines played college football as a tight end and wide receiver for the University of Florida Gators football team from 2009 to 2012. At Florida, he caught 64 passes for 801 yards.

Professional career

Baltimore Ravens
On April 27, 2013, he signed with the Baltimore Ravens as an undrafted free agent.

On July 22, 2013, Hines was waived by the Baltimore Ravens.

Green Bay Packers
On July 29, 2013, Hines was signed by the Green Bay Packers.

On August 25, 2013, Hines was released by the Green Bay Packers.

References

 "Versatile Hines hard to handle", The Gainesville Sun, The (FL) - October 9, 2012 
 "Hines, Corsicana native, is Gators' versatile weapon", McClatchy-Tribune Regional News, September 6, 2012 
 "UF's versatile Hines", The Gainesville Sun, August 27, 2012 
 "Florida Gators’ Omarius Hines is ‘a threat ... a weapon’,  After a “long journey” of waiting for his first four years, redshirt senior Omarius Hines might be used in many offensive skill positions this season", The Miami Herald, August 26, 2012 
 "Florida Gator Omarius Hines ready to make up for lost time", Tampa Bay Times, August 23, 2012 
 "Hines to help UF catch up The Florida tight end getting time in backfield to provide offensive spark", The Florida Times-Union,  October 17, 2010 
 "Florida Gators' Omarius Hines more than tight end,  Omarius Hines might start UF's season opener at tight end, but he has the strength and speed to be a threat as a wideout, as well", The Miami Herald, September 2, 2010

1989 births
Living people
American football wide receivers
Baltimore Ravens players
Florida Gators football players
People from Corsicana, Texas
Players of American football from Texas
Green Bay Packers players